EaseMyTrip is an Indian online travel company, founded in 2008 by Nishant Pitti, Rikant Pitti, and Prashant Pitti. Headquartered in New Delhi, the company provides hotel bookings, air tickets, holiday packages, bus bookings, and white-label services. EaseMyTrip has overseas offices in Singapore, UAE, Maldives, and Thailand.

History 

The idea for EaseMyTrip came when the brothers, Nishant Pitti and Rikant Pitti used to book air tickets for their father's frequent business trips, and saved money in the booking process. Initially based out of their home garage as a travel agency, the duo lost all of the initial investment within the first three months.

Later on, references from family and friends helped and a major turnaround came when an airline noticed multiple bookings coming from a single email account and contacted the Pitti brothers to become its travel partner.

Nandan Jha joined as the COO in 2017

In 2019, EaseMyTrip had a network of more than 42,000 travel agents, 1,200 franchise outlets, 640 white-label solutions, and around 1,600 distributors.

In January 2020, EaseMyTrip announced it will allow users to book flight tickets via WhatsApp. Users can activate the autonomous interactive program by sending a message and the booking bot will guide users through the end-to-end process.

In March 2021, EaseMyTrip went public.

In May 2021, it was reported to be the fastest growing online travel agency.

In June 2021, EaseMyTrip collaborated with Oyo Rooms, Airbnb, and Yatra to form the Confederation of Hospitality, Technology and Tourism Industry (CHATT), an industry body for the tourism sector of India.

In September 2021, it became a unicorn after its market capitalization crossed $1 billion. In December 2021, the organization hired Vijay Raaz and Varun Sharma as their brand ambassadors.

EaseMyTrip has acquired Spree Hospital, a hospital management company established in 2011 by Keshab Baljee for an undisclosed amount. Spree Hospitality was the company's second acquisition. The officials of the EaseMyTrip stated that the acquisition will not only increase the company's revenue but will also enhance the company's portfolio.

In the year 2019, EaseMyTrip expanded its operations to international markets such as UAE, UK, US, Philippines, Singapore, and Thailand and reported a consolidated revenue of ₹59.78 crore. In 2022,  the company had a 23% drop in net profit by the end of financial year in 2022 to ₹23 crore, as compared to ₹30 crore in 2021.

The company announced the acquisition of travel marketplace Traviate in October 2021. In the same year, the company launched another feature where if a person can show a waiting ticket in a train, they would get a discount from Easemytrip on flights.

Recently, a consumer technology firm from Pune called udChalo filed a trademark infringement case against EaseMyTrip. Previously, MakeMyTrip also moved to Delhi High Court against the company and Google both for Trademark violation.

IPO and Acquisitions 
In 2019, it filed for a ₹510 crore ($72.13 million) initial public offering (IPO) with the Securities and Exchange Board of India (SEBI), making them the first online travel agency to be listed on the Indian share market. The issue was managed by Axis Bank and JM Financial. It opened for subscription on 8 March 2021 and was listed on the stock market on 19 March 2021. The IPO was subscribed over 159 times.

HSBC Global Investment Funds, Tata Trustee Company, Aditya Birla Sunlife Insurance Company, Nomura, Sundaram Mutual Fund, Nippon Life India Trustee Company, and Bajaj Allianz Life Insurance Company were its anchor investors. After the company's IPO launched, the company observed a profit of 86% in 2020-2021 with a loss of booking revenue of 50% because of COVID-19.

EaseMyTrip acquired YoloBus which is an intercity mobility platform in 2021 in the non-air segment.

Philanthropy 
In 2018, the employees of the company contributed a day's salary for the relief measures of Kerala floods.

During the second wave of the COVID-19 oxygen crisis in India, the company donated 550 oxygen concentrators and launched a refund policy that promised full refund for ticket cancellations, including the costs deducted by the airlines.

Recognition 

 Best Travel Booking Site - SATTE (2020)
 Best Travel Booking App/Website  - Times Travel Awards (2019)
Enterprise Excellence of the Year - 24MRC Network (2016)
Best Online Travel Company of the Year - Worldwide Achievers Business Leadership Awards (2013)

References

External links 
Official Website

Travel ticket search engines
Indian companies established in 2008
Transport companies established in 2008
Internet properties established in 2008
Indian travel websites
Online travel agencies
Companies listed on the National Stock Exchange of India
Companies listed on the Bombay Stock Exchange
Travel and holiday companies of India